Pindorama is a municipality in the state of São Paulo, Brazil. The name is Tupi (later Paulista General) for Land of the Palms, the natives name for Brazil. According to tradition, before colonisation "Pindorama" (Tupi for "Land of the Palms") was the native name of Brazil, given by the local indigenous peoples.

Location

The population is 17,216 (2020 est.) in an area of 184.8 km². 
The municipality contains the  Pindorama Biological Reserve, a strictly protected conservation unit created in 1986 from a former experimental agricultural station.
Pindorama belongs to the Mesoregion of São José do Rio Preto.

Economy

The Tertiary sector corresponds to 57.86% of Pindorama's GDP. The Primary sector is 9.45% of the GDP and the Industry corresponds to 32.70%.

References

Municipalities in São Paulo (state)